Stan is a rural locality (a village) in Nikolskoye Rural Settlement, Kaduysky District, Vologda Oblast, Russia. The population was 104 as of 2002.

Geography 
Stan is located 27 km northeast of Kaduy (the district's administrative centre) by road. Nikolskoye is the nearest rural locality.

References 

Rural localities in Kaduysky District